Cyrus Gerald Ainsworth (4 August 1888 – 20 February 1940) was an English first-class cricketer. Ainsworth's batting style is unknown. He was born at Bury, Lancashire.

Ainsworth qualified as a surgeon prior to 1915. It was during World War I that he was enlisted as a surgeon in the Royal Navy in September 1915. He continued to serve in the Royal Navy following the end of the war, as he was selected to play a first-class cricket match for the Royal Navy against Cambridge University at Fenner's in 1919. In a match Cambridge University won by an innings and 84 runs, Ainsworth scored 6 runs in the Royal Navy's first-innings, before he was dismissed by Gordon Fairbairn, while in their second-innings he top scored with 71, before being dismissed by Gilbert Ashton.

He died at Elton, Lancashire on 20 February 1940.

References

External links
Cyrus Ainsworth at ESPNcricinfo
Cyrus Ainsworth at CricketArchive

1888 births
1940 deaths
Cricketers from Bury, Greater Manchester
20th-century English medical doctors
Royal Navy personnel of World War I
English cricketers
Royal Navy cricketers